Joseph Regenstein (1889 – 1957) was probably the son of Martin R. (* 1874 in Pasing near Munich – 1909 in Chicago) and Theodore Regensteiners nephew. He was an American industrialist whose philanthropy benefited the city of Chicago, especially the University of Chicago, where the Regenstein Library is named in his memory.

As head of Arvey Corp., Regenstein made many innovations in the paper, plastic and chemical fields. In 1931, Regenstein formed a business with his cousin, Julius Hyman, the Velsicol Chemical Corporation that manufactured several chlorinated insecticides including Dieldrin, Aldrin, Chlordane and Heptachlor which were the focus of Rachel Carson's book Silent Spring. Regenstein and Hyman would later fall out when Hyman set up an independent business in Colorado to manufacture insecticides at the Rocky Mountain Arsenal. Numerous lawsuits followed.

Regenstein maintained an intense interest in the development of Chicago and its institutions. To honor him, the Joseph and Helen Regenstein Foundation, on November 9, 1965, gave $10,000,000 toward the new graduate research library at University of Chicago. His son Joseph Regenstein Jr was a life trustee of the university until his death on March 4, 1999, at age 75.

Literature
 Gudrun Azar et al. 'Ins Licht gerückt. Jüdische Lebenswege im Münchner Westen'. München 2008, 159–160, Herbert Utz Verlag,  (Katalog der gleichnamigen Ausstellung in der Pasinger Fabrik, 10. April bis 25. Mai 2008).

Link 
 Theodore Regensteiner

 Regensteiner-Linde in Pasing Helenes Linde Sueddeutsche Zeitung

 Automobilwerk Pasing Siegfried Regensteiner

References

The Joseph Regenstein Library Building

1889 births
1957 deaths
20th-century American businesspeople
20th-century philanthropists